Licchavi () was an ancient Indo-Aryan tribe of north-eastern Indian subcontinent whose existence is attested from the Iron Age to the Classical Age.

Location
The Licchavikas lived in the southwest part of the Vajjika League, which was itself bounded to the north, east, south, and west, respectively, by the Himālaya mountains, and the Mahānadī, Gaṅgā, and Sadānirā rivers. The Sadānirā river was the Licchavikas' western border, and the Gaṅgā river as their border with the kingdom of Magadha in the south. The capital of the Licchavikas was located at Vesālī (Vaishali), which also acted as the headquarters of the Vajjika League led by Licchavi.

Name
The tribal name  is a Māgadhī Prākrit derivation of the word , meaning "bear".

The Sanskrit form of the name  would have been , from the Sanskrit word for bear, . This Sanskrit form of the name was however not commonly used, and both Sanskrit and Pāli instead borrowed and used the Māgadhī Prakrit form . This use of a tribal name derived from the name of the bear might have had a totemic significance.

History

Origin
The Licchavikas were an Indo-Aryan tribe in the eastern Gangetic plain in the Greater Magadha cultural region. They conquered the territory of the Mahā-Videha kingdom, and temporarily occupied the Vaideha capital of Mithilā, from where they could best administer the territory of Mahā-Videha. The consequence of the occupation of Mahā-Videha by the republican Licchavikas was that the latter relatively peacefully overthrew the already weakened Vaideha monarchical system and replaced it by a republican system.

Facing the rising power of Magadha to the south of the Gaṅgā, the Licchavikas established their republic in the southern part of the former Mahā-Videha kingdom and moved their political centre to the until then marginal location of Vesālī, which the Licchavikas turned into their largest city as well as their capital and stronghold. Meanwhile, the new Videha republic existed in a limited territory centred around Mithilā and located to the north of the Licchavikas. Many members of the Vaideha aristocracy who had submitted to the Licchavikas joined them in moving to Vesālī, and therefore became members of the Licchavika ruling aristocratic Assembly.

Statehood
The Licchavikas themselves henceforth became the leading power within the territory of the former Mahā-Videha kingdom, with the Licchavika Assembly holding the sovereign and supreme rights over this territory while the Videha republic was ruled by an Assembly of the s residing in and around Mithilā, and governing in the name of the Licchavika Assembly. The Videha republic was thus under significant influence of the Licchavi republic, which it joined as one of the two most important members of the Vajjika League, which was a temporary league led by Licchavi within which the latter held nine of the eighteen seats of the Vajjika Council, while the Vaidehas held a smaller number of seats among the remaining none ones. Within the Vajjika League, Videha maintained limited autonomy concerning its domestic administration under the supervision of Licchavi, who fully controlled Vaideha foreign policy.

Ceḍaga's sister Trisalā was married to the Nāyika  Siddhārtha, with this marriage having been contracted because of Siddhārtha's political importance due to the important geographical location close to Vesālī of the Nāya tribe he headed, as well as due to Siddhārtha's membership in the Vajjika Council. The son of Siddhārtha and Trisalā, that is Ceḍaga's nephew, was Mahāvīra, the 24th Jain Tīrthaṅkara. Ceṭaka became an adept of the teachings of his nephew Mahāvīra and adopted Jainism, thus making the Licchavika and Vajjika capital of Vesālī a bastion of Jainism, and his sixth daughter, Sujyeṣṭhā, became a Jain nun, while the diplomatic marriages of his other daughters to various leaders, in turn, contributed to the spreading of Jainism across northern South Asia: Prabhāvatī was married to the king Udāyana of Sindhu-Sauvīra; Padmāvatī was married to king Dadhivāhana of Aṅga; Mṛgāvatī was married to the king Śatānīka of Vatsa, with their son being the famous Udayana; Śivā was married to king Pradyota of Avanti;  Jyeṣṭhā was married to Ceṭaka's nephew, Nandivardhana of Kuṇḍagāma, who was the son of Trisalā and the elder brother of Mahāvīra; Cellaṇā was married to the king Bimbisāra of Magadha.

The Licchavikas and the Mallakas were considered to be the republican states of Kāsī-Kosala by Jain sources, and both Mallaka republics joined the Licchavi-led Vajjika League to deal with danger they might have faced in common during periods of instability, and within which they held friendly relations with the Licchavikas, the Vaidehas, and the Nāyikas who were the other members of this league, although occasional quarrels did break out between these republics. Unlike the other confederate tribes such as the Vaidehas and Nāyikas, who had no sovereign rights of their own because they were dependencies of Licchavi, the Mallakas maintained their own sovereign rights within the Vajjika League.

The Licchavikas' relations with the Kosala kingdom of the king Pasenadi were friendly, although quarrels occasionally arose among them, such as when the wife of the Mallaka general Bandhula, who was himself in the service of Kosala, decided to have a bath in the sacred tank of the Licchavikas in which only Licchavika s were allowed to bathe.

After the death of the Buddha, the Licchavikas, the Mallakas, and the Sakyas claimed shares of his relics while the Vaidehas and the Nāyikas did not appear among the list of states claiming a share because they were dependencies of the Licchavikas without their own sovereignty, and therefore could not put forth their own claim while Licchavi could.

Conquest by Magadha

The relations of the Licchavikas with their southern neighbour, the kingdom of Magadha, were initially good, and the wife of the Māgadhī king Bimbisāra was the Vesālia princess Vāsavī, who was the daughter of the Licchavika  Sakala's son Siṃha. There were nevertheless occasional tensions between Licchavi and Magadha, such as the competition at the Mallaka capital of Kusinārā over acquiring the relics of the Buddha after his death.

In another case, the Licchavikas once invaded Māgadhī territory from across the Gaṅgā, and at some point the relations between Magadha and Licchavi permanently deteriorated as result of a grave offence committed by the Licchavikas towards the Māgadhī king Bimbisāra.

The hostilities between Licchavi and Magadha continued under the rule of Ajātasattu, who was Bimbisāra's son with another Licchavika princess, Vāsavī, after he had killed Bimbisāra and usurped the throne of Magadha. Eventually Licchavi supported a revolt against Ajātasattu by his younger step-brother and the governor of Aṅga, Vehalla, who was the son of Bimbisāra by another Licchavika wife of his, Cellanā, a daughter of Ceḍaga, who was the head of both the Licchavi republic and the Vajjika League; Bimbisāra had chosen Vehalla as his successor following Ajātasattu's falling out of his favour after the latter had been caught conspiring against him, and the Licchavikas had attempted to place Vehalla on the throne of Magadha after Ajātasattu's usurpation and had allowed Vehalla to use their capital Vesālī as base for his revolt. After the failure of this rebellion, Vehalla sought refuge at his grandfather's place in the Licchavika and Vajjika capital of Vesālī, following which Ajātasattu repeatedly attempted to negotiate with the Licchavikas-Vajjikas. After Ajātasattu's repeated negotiation attempts ended in failure, he declared war on the Vajjika League in 484 BCE.

Tensions between Licchavi and Magadha were exacerbated by the handling of the joint Māgadhī-Licchavika border post of Koṭigāma on the Gaṅgā by the Licchavika-led Vajjika League who would regularly collect all valuables from Koṭigāma and leave none to the Māgadhīs. Therefore Ajātasattu decided to destroy the Vajjika League in retaliation, but also because, as an ambitious empire-builder whose mother Vāsavī was Licchavika princess of Vaidehī descent, he was interested in the territory of the former Mahā-Videha kingdom which by then was part of the Vajjika League. Ajātasattu's hostility towards the Vajjika League was also the result of the differing forms of political organisation between Magadha and the Vajjika League, with the former being monarchical and the latter being republican, not unlike the opposition of the ancient Greek kingdom of Sparta to the democratic form of government in Athens, and the hostilities between the ancient Macedonian king Philip II to the Athenian and Theban republics.

As members of the Vajjika League, the Vaidehas, Nāyikas, and Mallakas were also threatened by Ajātasattu, and the Vajjika  Ceḍaga held war consultations with the s of the Licchavikas and Mallikas before the fight started. The Vaidehas, Nāyikas, and Mallakas therefore fought on the side of the League against Magadha. The military forces of the Vajjika League were initially too strong for Ajātasattu to be successful against them, and it required him having recourse to diplomacy and intrigues over the span of a decade to finally defeat the Vajjika League by 468 BCE and annex its territories, including Licchavi, Videha, and Nāya to the kingdom of Magadha, while the Mallakas also became part of Ajātasattu's Māgadhī empire but were allowed a limited degree of autonomy in terms of their internal administration. The Licchavikas nevertheless survived their defeat by Ajātasattu, and the structures of the older Licchavi republic subsisted within a degree local autonomy under Māgadhī rule, as attested by how the Licchavika Council instituted a festival in the memory of the decease of the Jain Tīrthaṅkara Mahāvīra.

Later periods
The Licchavikas survived as a distinct political and ethnic entity for centuries after their defeat by the Māgadhīs, and they became powerful again after the disintegration of the Maurya Empire.

The Licchavikas are mentioned for the last time during the early period of the Gupta Empire, when the Licchavika princess Kumāradevī married Chandragupta I, as attested on the legends of the coinage of their son Samudragupta, who called himself  ("maternal grandson of the Licchavikas") in his inscriptions.

That the Licchavikas survived beyond this period is however evidenced by how a branch of this people formed a Licchavi kingdom in Nepal.

Social and political organisation

Republican institutions

The Assembly
Out of the total estimated 200,000 to 300,000 population of Licchavi, the tribe's governing class was composed of 7,707 unelected members (called , meaning "ruler") who were constituted into the Licchavi republic's Assembly, which was the sovereign power of the state. Reflecting the Licchavikas' tribal nature, the s held the status of s, similarly to the ancient Greek system of the aristocracy of heads of houses, and they were automatically accorded membership to the Licchavika Assembly. Thus, the Licchavikas, like their Mallaka, Vaideha, and Nāyika confederates within the Vajjika League, were a  tribe, and their s were the heads of the  ruling families of Licchavi living in and near Vesālī, who held their titles for life unless they were physically disabled or had been found guilty of serious crimes, and had full political rights at the Assembly of Vesālī, which they had the right to attend and within which they held seats, although they were not obligated to always attend its sessions. Power was shared evenly by these s and was exercised by the majority.

These s officially would, during the General Assembly of Vesālī, succeed their fathers who had died during the preceding year or had become too old to continue exercising their duties. This ceremony consisted of the representatives of the Licchavika  families taking a sacred bath before being anointed as s, and was held at the sacred tank, named  in Pāli ( in Sanskrit), where only the Licchavika rulers were allowed to bathe.

Non-s had no political rights in the Licchavi republic, similarly to how only the Patricians held political power during the earlier periods of the Roman Republic. Otherwise, non-citizens who held complaints or grievances had to approach the Assembly or the Council directly.

The Licchavika Assembly functioned like the Ancient Greek Athenian , the Roman magistracy, and the Germanic . Like the Germanic , the Assembly of the Licchavikas had no division between the legislative, executive, and judicial functions, and it tried legal cases and elected the consul and the general-in-chief.

In normal times, the General Assembly of Vesālī met only once a year during the annual spring festival for important and serious issues, and otherwise the full Assembly's meetings would have been held only on the occasion of specific military, social, and economic events.

Functioning of the Assembly 
The  ("collector of the wood pieces") was an important office whose holder was elected because of his known honesty and impartiality, and his consent as to whether he would accept the post was required, after which whoever had proposed this candidate had to demand the approval of the : those who supported the candidature remained silent while those opposed to it spoke and proposed other candidates, after which a quorum was required.

When the Licchavikas held elections, the  announced that elections were to be held in the Assembly hall, where the gathered members of the Assembly put names forward and s were distributed. The  counted the participants and determined whether the quorum had been filled or not.

The  (Consul)
The  was the Licchavi republic's chief officer, that is the supreme , who was both the head of the state and the supreme judge, and was elected by the General Assembly of Vesālī for a limited period of time generally lasting between 10 and 15 years. The criteria for election to the post of  like his age, political wisdom, strength of character, bravery in battle, eloquence in the Assembly, and popularity among the citizens.

The Council
Once the successful candidates had been elected, they were solemnly consecrated by being honoured with a traditional ceremonial bath and anointed at the  during the spring festival.

This Council met regularly to administer the public affairs of the Licchavi republic and had to answer for its actions to the Assembly; the Council was thus in charge of planning and policy of the Licchavi republic, and had to demand the approval of the Licchavika Assembly for important matters. Other tasks of the Council would have included preparing the agenda for the Licchavi republic's annual General Assembly, the consecration of the s, and handling other important issues, as well as  arranging for filling posts and ranks whose holders had died or could not otherwise perform their duties.

Vaideha institutions
Since Videha was a dependency of Licchavi, the Vaideha Council, which was the body with the supreme authority of the internal administration of the Videha republic, held the supreme power of Videha under the administration of the Licchavikas.

State of emergency
In normal situations, the Licchavika Council carried out the administration of the Licchavi republic without much difficulty without needing to call emergency meetings of the Assembly. However during the periods of hostilities with Magadha, both the Council and the Assembly met frequently more than once a year, and the Council often consulted with the Assembly, with the importance of the measures of the Assembly gaining in importance during the continued states of emergency and war, similarly to how the power and prestige of the Roman Senate increased during the Punic Wars and the Roman–Greek wars.

Under these circumstances, the Assembly was the supreme authority in all governmental domains while the role of the Council was only to implements its requests and commands.

Villages
Within Licchavika territory, artisans such as carpenters, smiths and potters, and who possibly did not ethnically belong to the Licchavi tribe, as well as s, had villages of their own.

Role of women
Women in the Licchavi republic held no citizen rights at Vesālī, and were largely reduced to the role of being housewives. Although women participated in Licchavika social life, they were not allowed to participate in the political assemblies.

Ambapālī
The elected courtesan Ampabālī was the woman held to be the most beautiful in Licchavi and was elected for life to be the wife of the Licchavi republic itself. The Licchavikas honoured Ambapālī during the week of the spring festival.

The army
The Licchavikas possessed a strong army which also acted as the army of the Vajjika League, and with which they were able to fight against the rising power of Magadha. When not engaged in warfare, the soldiers would be cultivating their own farms or amusing themselves at Vesālī.

The police
The Licchavikas possessed a body of peons or police. Although s were not forbidden from joining this police force, the ruling families did not participate in this lower ranking form of service, and the members of the Licchavi police were recruited primarily from the artisan classes.

See also
The Licchavi kingdom of Nepal

References

Citations

Sources

 

 

Gaṇa saṅghas
Ancient peoples of India
Mahajanapadas
Licchavi kingdom
Mithila
History of Bihar
5th century BC in India
Ancient peoples of Nepal